The discography of Eskimo Joe, an Australian rock band, consists of six studio albums, one live album, one compilation album, four extended plays, twenty-two singles and one video album.

Albums

Studio albums

Live albums

Compilation albums

Video albums

Extended plays

Singles

Notes

JJJ References for the Triple J Hottest 100:  1998, 1999, 2001, 2003, 2004, 2006.

Other appearances

Music videos

References

External links

Discographies of Australian artists
Rock music group discographies